The Visconti Castle of Cherasco is a medieval castle in Cherasco, Piedmont, Northern Italy. It was built in the 14th century by Luchino Visconti, Lord of Milan, and partly reconstructed at the beginning of the 20th century.

Location
Cherasco lies on a wedge-shaped plateau, a naturally protected area, where the rivers Stura di Demonte and Tanaro meet. The castle is located at the town's border, in a prominent position overlooking the two rivers' confluence.

History
In the 13th century, during the communal era, the local Commune strengthened the stronghold that probably already existed on the current castle site. Later, Cherasco entered into the dominions of the Savoy house.

In 1348, the Lord of Milan Luchino Visconti defeated the Savoy and conquered Cherasco. He decided to fortify the city and ordered the construction of a new castle. It had a quadrangular structure with a tower at each corner and a smaller central tower with a drawbridge at the entrance, an arrangement frequent in the Visconti dominions. It was entirely constructed with bricks.

Among the western Visconti territories, Cherasco played an important part. It appeared twice as a dowry in dynasty marriages: in 1368 when Violante Visconti married Lionel Duke of Clarence, and in 1387 when Valentina Visconti married Louis Duke of Orléans.

In 1559, following the Treaty of Cateau-Cambrésis, the castle returned to the Savoy house. They used it as a refuge on several occasions, to escape the plague in 1630 and the French in 1706. In 1691, Victor Amadeus II of Savoy decided to concentrate the defense of his territories in a few strongholds suitable for the purpose. The castle of Cherasco was not among them. Accordingly, it was deliberately partially blown up to no longer serve as a military fortification. What remained of the ancient castle, reduced to semi-ruin, served as a barracks until 1815, and later as a farmhouse.

At the beginning of the 20th century, the castle passed to new owners, who almost wholly refurbished the building's survived parts. They restored the walls with extensive insertions, elevated the towers, and redesigned the interior. The final result was a partly reconstructed castle outside, while inside a residential estate with an Italian style garden.

Today
The castle is privately owned and open only from the outside. The landscape's view beyond the building can nevertheless be glimpsed. It is one of the several historical buildings of Cherasco.

References

Sources

External links
 Castelli e torri d’Italia - Castello Visconteo di Cherasco
 Piemonte, Italia – Castello di Cherasco

Castles in Piedmont
Cherasco